Tropidodiscidae is an extinct family of Paleozoic fossil molluscs with isostrophically coiled shells. They are of uncertain position taxonomically, in other words it is not known whether they were (Gastropoda (snails) or Monoplacophora)s.

Taxonomy 
The taxonomy of the Gastropoda by Bouchet & Rocroi, 2005 categorizes Tropidodiscidae in the superfamilia Bellerophontoidea within the 
Paleozoic molluscs of uncertain systematic position with isostrophically coiled shells (Gastropoda or Monoplacophora). This family has no subfamilies.

Genera 
Genera in the family Tropidodiscidae include:
 Tropidodiscus Meek & Worthen, 1866 - type genus of the family Tropidodiscidae

References 

Prehistoric gastropods